Shulem Deen (born 1974) is an American author, essayist, former Skver Hasid, and critic of Hasidic Judaism. He is the author of the memoir All Who Go Do Not Return (2015), and is a regular columnist at The Forward. He is also the founding editor of Unpious, a journal for voices critical of Hasidic lifestyle and beliefs.

Career 
Deen first became known as the author of the blog "Hasidic Rebel", which he wrote from 2003 until 2012, and which was the subject of a 2003 feature article in the Village Voice. Deen's blog was the first widely read website by a born Hasid casting doubt on his religious faith. In 2010, Deen launched the Unpious website, along with "Shtreimel", another ex-Hasidic blogger, and has served as its editor throughout. The site was intended as a platform for voices critical of the Hasidic lifestyle and beliefs.

Deen's memoir, All Who Go Do Not Return, was published in 2015, and chronicles his transition from devout member of the Skver Hasidic sect to secular Jew. Deen's book is part of a subgenre of memoirs by formerly Haredi writers, and is considered to be one of the best.

Deen is a regular columnist at The Forward, and writes widely on the intersection of Hasidic and secular life, including articles in the New Republic, Salon, and Tablet. His work is also seen to be critical of the Hasidic lifestyle and worldview.

He currently serves as a board member at Footsteps, a New York City organization that assists formerly Haredi Jews with transitioning to life outside the Haredi world.

Awards 
 2015 National Jewish Book Awards, Myra H. Kraft Memorial Award for Contemporary Jewish Life and Practice
 2016 Great Lakes Colleges Association New Writers Award for Creative Non-Fiction
 2017 Prix Médicis essai for Celui qui va vers elle ne revient pas (All Who Go Do Not Return)

Personal life 
Deen spent his early life among Satmar Hasidim in the Borough Park section of Brooklyn, and joined the Skver Hasidic dynasty when he was a teenager, moving to the town of New Square, New York, the movement's headquarters, to settle after marriage. He was married in 1993, and has five children. In 2005, Deen was expelled from New Square by its leaders for holding heretical views, and several years later, he divorced his wife and left the Hasidic lifestyle entirely. He is mostly estranged from his children, who have remained among the Skverer Hasidim in New Square, New York. He currently lives in Brooklyn, New York.

Select articles 
 "Too Cool", Tablet, June 22, 2011
 "The Sound of Sin", Salon, April 19, 2012
 "In Death of Ex-Hasid, a Mirror for Trauma of Many", Tablet, October 2, 2013
 "Op-Ed: Chasidic Schools Ensure Ignorance and Poverty", The Jewish Week, September 17, 2015
 "My Roommate, the Prostitute", Narratively, January 7, 2015
 "How I Kept My Faith in Faith", The Forward, December 1, 2015

References

External links 
 Official Website
 VIDEO: A Life Apart, An Ex-Hasid in Brooklyn: BK Stories, by BRIC TV
 Interview with Brian Lehrer on WNYC radio
 Story Feature on Reply All Podcast

21st-century American memoirists
Jewish American writers
1974 births
Living people
Hasidic Judaism
Writers from Brooklyn
Disengagement from religion
American male non-fiction writers
Yiddish-speaking people
Skver (Hasidic dynasty)
Prix Médicis essai winners
Former Orthodox Jews